Muaither SC is a multi-sports club based in Muaither, Qatar. It is best known for its football department, which plays in the Qatari Second Division.

History

1996–2013: Second division
The club was founded in 1996 as "Al Shabab". It changed its name to "Al Muaither" in 2004 by decision of the Qatar Olympic Committee. They played exclusively in the Qatari Second Division until 2013.

Their first promotion play-off was in the 1999–00 season against Qatar SC.

In 2004, Muaither became the first team in history from the second division to win the Sheikh Jassem Cup. They defeated Al-Wakrah SC 2–1 in the final.

They finished as runners-up of the Second Division in the 2012 and 2013 season, which earned them promotion play-off matches against Umm Salal and Al Arabi. They lost the first match against Umm Salal, which was the club's second promotion play-off match in its history, by a scoreline of 0–1 after extra time in 2012. They also lost 1–2 against Al Arabi after extra time in 2013.

Their president, Saleh Al-Aji, filed a complaint on 23 April against Al Arabi under the pretense that they were fielding a suspended player, Baba Keita. This was according to the league statistics available on the Qatar Football Association's website. The QFA dashed their hope of being promoted by officially stating that the information they presented was not available on the website, and that Muaither must have acquired the information from third-party sources.

2013–2014: Qatar Stars League
It was announced on 7 May 2013 that the Qatar Stars League would expand to 14 clubs, which inferred that Muaither would be promoted to the first division despite losing the relegation play-off.

Their first action in the first division was to hire renowned Spanish-French coach, Ladislas Lozano.

They were relegated at the end of the 2013–14 season, along with Al Rayyan.

Current team staff

Current squad
As of Qatari Second Division:

Honours 
Qatari Second Division
Winners (1): 2015–16

Qatari Sheikh Jassim Cup
Winners (1): 2003

Managerial history 
 Fareed Ramzi (2004)
 Sabri Miniawy (2004–2006)
 Wameed Mounir (2006)
 Abdelkadir Bomir (2006–2007)
 Abdulrahman Taleb (2007–2008)
 Abdullah Saad (2009)
 Silvio Diliberto (2009–2012)
 Mohammed Sahel (2012–2013)
 Ladislas Lozano (19 June 2013–1 February 2014)
 Mohammed Sahel (1 February 2014–present)

References

External links
 Official website

Football clubs in Qatar
1996 establishments in Qatar
Association football clubs established in 1996